Herzogtum Lauenburg – Stormarn-Süd (English: Duchy of Lauenburg – Stormarn-South) is an electoral constituency (German: Wahlkreis) represented in the Bundestag. It elects one member via first-past-the-post voting. Under the current constituency numbering system, it is designated as constituency 10. It is located in southern Schleswig-Holstein, comprising most of the Herzogtum Lauenburg district and southern parts of the Stormarn district.

Herzogtum Lauenburg – Stormarn-Süd was created for the 1976 federal election. Since 2021, it has been represented by Nina Scheer of the Social Democratic Party (SPD).

Geography
Herzogtum Lauenburg – Stormarn-Süd is located in southern Schleswig-Holstein. As of the 2021 federal election, it contains the all of the Herzogtum Lauenburg district with the exception of the Amt of Berkenthin and the former Amt of Sandesneben (now part of Sandesneben-Nusse). It also includes the southern part of Stormarn district, specifically the Ämter of Siek and Trittau and the urban municipalities of Ahrensburg, Barsbüttel, Glinde, Großhansdorf, Oststeinbek, and Reinbek.

History
Herzogtum Lauenburg – Stormarn-Süd was created in 1976, replacing the abolished constituency of Stormarn – Herzogtum Lauenburg. Originally, it contained the entirety of the Herzogtum Lauenburg district, and a slightly larger part of the Stormarn distract. In the 2002 election, the Ämter of Berkenthin and Sandesneben were transferred to the Lübeck constituency, while the urban municipality of Ammersbek was transferred to the Segeberg – Stormarn-Nord constituency.

Members
The constituency was held by the Christian Democratic Union (CDU) from its creation in 1976 until 1980, during which time it was represented by Olaf Baron von Wrangel. It was won by the Social Democratic Party (SPD) in 1980, and represented by Eckart Kuhlwein for a single term. Michael von Schmude regained it for the CDU in 1983, and served as its member until 1998. From 1998 to 2005, it was held by the SPD, during which time it was represented by Thomas Sauer. Carl-Eduard von Bismarck regained it for the CDU in 2005 and served for a single term, before being succeeded by party fellow Norbert Brackmann in 2009. He was re-elected in 2013 and 2017. Nina Scheer won the constituency for the SPD in 2021.

Election results

2021 election

2017 election

2013 election

2009 election

Notes

References

Federal electoral districts in Schleswig-Holstein
1976 establishments in West Germany
Constituencies established in 1976